The following is a list of FCC-licensed radio stations in the U.S. state of Delaware, which can be sorted by their call signs, frequencies, cities of license, licensees, and programming formats.

List of radio stations

Defunct
 WNWK
 WRJE

See also
 Delaware media
 List of newspapers in Delaware
 List of television stations in Delaware
 Media of locales in Delaware: Dover, Wilmington

References

Bibliography

External links

  (Directory ceased in 2017)
 Maryland, DC, Delaware Broadcasters Association

 
Delaware
Radio